Zhang Shougong (born 1 July 1957) is a Chinese forestry engineer and academician of the Chinese Academy of Engineering, formerly served as president of Chinese Academy of Forestry from 2007 to 2018.

Biography 
Zhang was born in Huaiyuan County, Anhui, on 1 July 1957. He holds a bachelor's degree from Anhui Agricultural University, and master's and doctor's degrees from Beijing Forestry University, all in forestry.

He was despatched to the Chinese Academy of Forestry in 1990, becoming vice president in 1997 and president in 2008. On 24 February 2018, he became a delegate to the 13th National People's Congress. In March 2018, he was appointed vice chairperson of the National People's Congress Environment Protection and Resources Conservation Committee. 

He was a representative of the 17th National Congress of the Communist Party of China.

Honours and awards 
 2001 State Science and Technology Progress Award (Second Class)
 2002 State Science and Technology Progress Award (Second Class)
 2010 State Science and Technology Progress Award (Second Class)
 27 November 2017 Member of the Chinese Academy of Engineering (CAE)

References 

1957 births
Living people
People from Huaiyuan County
Engineers from Anhui
Anhui Agricultural University alumni
Beijing Forestry University alumni
Delegates to the 13th National People's Congress
Members of the Chinese Academy of Engineering